Takifugu poecilonotus, the finepatterned puffer, or Komon-fugu, is a species of pufferfish, one of 25 in the genus Takifugu. It is found in the northwest Pacific Ocean at shallow depths up to 20m. It contains tetrodotoxin like other members of the genus Takifugu. This species is found in fresh, brackish and saltwater environments.

See also
Grass puffer

References

Further reading 
 Shao, K., Liu, M., Larson, H., Jing, L., Leis, J.L. & Matsuura, K. 2014. Takifugu poecilonotus. The IUCN Red List of Threatened Species 2014: e.T21342A2775386. https://dx.doi.org/10.2305/IUCN.UK.2014-3.RLTS.T21342A2775386.en. Downloaded on 28 March 2017.

Tetraodontidae
poecilonotus
Fish of Japan
Fish of East Asia
Fish of China
Fish described in 1850